Defant Glacier is a glacier  wide at its mouth, which flows east-southeast to the west side of Violante Inlet, on the east coast of Palmer Land. It was discovered and photographed from the air in December 1940 by the United States Antarctic Service; during 1947 the glacier was photographed from the air by members of the Ronne Antarctic Research Expedition, who in conjunction with the Falkland Islands Dependencies Survey (FIDS) charted it from the ground. It was named by the FIDS for Albert Defant, an Austrian meteorologist and oceanographer who was Professor of Oceanography at the "Friedrich-Wilhelms-Universität" (later Humboldt University) and also Director of the "Institut and Museum für Meereskunde" (Institute and Museum of Marine Science) in Berlin, Germany, from 1926 to 1945.

References

Glaciers of Palmer Land